Executive Order 13694, signed on April 1, 2015 by U.S. President Barack Obama, is an Executive Order intended limit the proliferation of malicious cyber activities. The order seeks to accomplish this by limiting threats to U.S. national security through the use of economic sanctions via the Specially Designated Nationals and Blocked Persons List (SDN List) as maintained by the Department of the Treasury's Office of Foreign Assets Control. 

The executive order was titled Blocking the Property of Certain Persons Engaging in Significant Malicious Cyber-Enabled Activities, declaring a national emergency to address an extant threat to national security, foreign policy, and the economy of the United States.

It was amended by Executive Order 13757: Taking Additional Steps to Address the National Emergency with Respect to Significant Malicious Cyber-Enabled Activities, which was signed on December 28, 2016 by President Obama.  This amended Executive Order 13694 to include interference in U.S. elections as a potential cause for economic sanctions.

Executive Order 13694 by Section

Notable Sanctions Under E.O. 13694

See also 

 Office of Foreign Assets Control
Specially Designated Nationals and Blocked Persons List
 Economic Sanctions
 International Emergency Economic Powers Act
 National Emergencies Act
 Immigration and Nationality Act of 1952
 United States Code

References 

Executive orders of Barack Obama